The VTi Engine (Variable Valve Lift and Timing injection) is a variable valve timing (VVT) system for car engines created jointly by both PSA Peugeot Citroën and BMW Group from the BMW VALVETRONIC concept.
There is both a 1.4 (95 bhp) and 1.6l (115 bhp) variant, with Peugeot claiming the capability to reduce fuel consumption on a Peugeot 307 by more than 10% compared to the 1.6l, 100 bhp engine.

Uses
Currently the only vehicles to use the VTi Engines are:
Citroën C3 - 1.4l + 1.6l.
Citroën C3 Picasso - 1.4l + 1.6l
Citroën C4 - 1.4l + 1.6l.
Citroën C4 Picasso - 1.6l.
Citroën DS3 - 1.6l.
Citroën DS4 - 1.6l.
Citroën C-Elysée (2017) 1.6l
Peugeot 108 - 1.0l + 1.2l.
Peugeot 207 - 1.4l + 1.6l.
Peugeot 208 - 1.0l + 1.2l. 
Peugeot 301 (2012) - 1.2l + 1.6l.
Peugeot 308 - 1.4l + 1.6l.
Peugeot 508 - 1.6l.
Peugeot 2008 - 1.2l + 1.6l
Peugeot 3008 - 1.6l.
Peugeot 5008 - 1.6l.

References

Automobile engines